Mark Montgomery (born April 30, 1966) is the head coach of the Maryland Terrapins softball program.

Coaching career

Louisiana Tech
On September 24, 2012, Montgomery was announced as the new head coach of the Louisiana Tech softball program.

Maryland
On September 9, 2019, Montgomery was announced as the new head coach of the Maryland softball program.

Head coaching record

References

External links
Maryland profile
Louisiana Tech profile
Northern Colorado profile
Centenary profile

1966 births
Living people
Eastern Kentucky University alumni
American softball coaches
Georgetown Tigers softball coaches
Centenary Ladies softball coaches
Northern Colorado Bears softball coaches
Louisiana Tech Lady Techsters softball coaches
Maryland Terrapins softball coaches